Esin Sağdıç (born 11 January 1988 in Izmir) is a Turkish female handballer playing in right wing position.

Sağdıç plays for Muratpaşa Bld. SK.

Achievements

National
 2010–11 İzmir Büyükşehir Belediyespor TWHSL 

Legend:
 TWHSL Turkish Women's Handball Super League

References 

1988 births
Living people
Sportspeople from İzmir
Turkish female handball players
İzmir Büyükşehir Belediyespor handball players
Muratpaşa Bld. SK (women's handball) players
Turkey women's national handball players
21st-century Turkish women